"Godless" is a song by American rock band The Dandy Warhols. It is the third single from their third studio album, Thirteen Tales from Urban Bohemia, released on 17 July 2001.

Release 

Released on 17 July 2001 as the third single from Thirteen Tales from Urban Bohemia, "Godless" peaked at No. 66 on the UK Singles Chart.

Reception 

Q praised the song, calling it "a marvellous concoction of parping trumpets, blasted vocals and headtrip guitar swirls". Robert Christgau cited the track as a highlight of the album.

Track listing

References

External links
 

The Dandy Warhols songs
2001 singles
2000 songs
Capitol Records singles
Songs written by Courtney Taylor-Taylor
Song recordings produced by Dave Sardy